Mario Fortuna was an Argentine actor. He starred in the 1950 film Campeón a la fuerza .

References

External links
 
 

Argentine male film actors
20th-century Argentine male actors